Sete Pedras (Portuguese for "seven stones") is a group of rocky islets in the Gulf of Guinea, part of São Tomé and Príncipe. The largest islet is 42 metres high. The islets were mentioned as "Seven Steen" (17th century Dutch for "seven stones") in the 1665 map by Johannes Vingboons.

References

Uninhabited islands of São Tomé and Príncipe
Caué District